John Gillespie is an American politician in the Tennessee House of Representatives representing the 97th House District, serving since November 2020. Gillespie was re-elected on November 8, 2022. Gillespie is a member of the Republican Party.

Political Experience
Running in a contested Primary Election on August 6, 2020, Gillespie received the Republican Nomination for Representative of the 97th House District when he defeated Brandon Weise 78.3% (3,626 votes) to 21.7% (1,007 votes). Gillespie then faced Gabby Salinas in the General Election on November 3, 2020 which Gillespie won 50.8% (14,712 votes) to 49.2% (14,246 votes).

Gillespie sponsored several key pieces of legislation this session to ensure law and order in the state and protect Tennessee’s most vulnerable citizens.

Legislation sponsored by Gillespie to ensure law and order includes:

House Bill 22 – Increases the penalty for drag racing from a Class B to a Class A misdemeanor.
House Bill 549 – Allows families of deputy jailers who are killed in the line of duty to receive compensation.
Legislation sponsored by Gillespie to protect Tennessee’s aging population includes:

House Bill 628 – Funds services for victims of abuse, neglect, financial or sexual exploitation of elderly or vulnerable persons as well as educational programs to prevent such abuse, neglect or exploitation.
House Bill 629 – Requires persons reporting known or suspected cases of abuse, neglect or exploitation of an adult to also notify the district attorney general in all such cases.
House Bill 630 – Modifies the reporting requirements for the vulnerable adult protective investigative team’s annual report to the chairs of the House and Senate Judiciary Committees
House Bill 718 – Enacts the “Safe Seniors Act of 2021,” taking dangerous individuals who abuse elderly and vulnerable populations off the streets.

Since he was elected to the Tennessee House of Representatives in November 2020, Gillespie has sponsored  piece of legislation, HB0022, which would amend Tennessee Code Annotated, Title 39 and Title 55 relative to drag racing. If passed and signed into law, this legislation would increase the penalty for drag racing from a Class B misdemeanor to a Class A misdemeanor.

Activity as member of the 112th General Assembly 
As a member of the 112th General Assembly, Gillespie is serving on the following committees:
Member, Children and Family Affairs Subcommittee
Member, Civil Justice Committee
Member, Education Administration Committee
Member, Finance, Ways, and Means Committee
Member, Higher Education Subcommittee

Career 
In addition to serving in the Tennessee House of Representatives, Gillespie's professional career began in the world of finance. After working for two local banks in Tennessee, he transitioned into a position where he writes and researches grants for a senior living facility.

Family

Gillespie, the son of Elizabeth and Trow Gillespie, is a native of Memphis, Tennessee.

Education
A graduate of High Point University in North Carolina, he earned a Bachelor of Arts degree in Political Science.

Religion
He is a longtime parishioner of Saint John's Episcopal Church.

References

Republican Party members of the Tennessee House of Representatives
Politicians from Memphis, Tennessee
High Point University alumni
Episcopalians from Tennessee
Year of birth missing (living people)
Living people